Glyphis is a genus of lichenized fungi in the family Graphidaceae. The genus has a widespread distribution, especially in tropical regions.

Species
As accepted by Species Fungorum;
Glyphis atrofusca 
Glyphis batuana 
Glyphis cicatricosa 
Glyphis cribrosa 
Glyphis dictyospora 
Glyphis frischiana 
Glyphis montoensis 
Glyphis scyphulifera 
Glyphis substriatula 

Former species;
 G. cicatricosa f. confluens  = Glyphis cicatricosa
 G. cicatricosa f. depauperata  = Glyphis cicatricosa
 G. cicatricosa var. confluens  = Glyphis cicatricosa
 G. cicatricosa var. depauperata  = Glyphis cicatricosa
 G. cicatricosa var. intermedia  = Glyphis cicatricosa
 G. colliculosa  = Sarcographa colliculosa, Graphidaceae
 G. confluens  = Glyphis cicatricosa
 G. cyclospora  = Sarcographina cyclospora, Graphidaceae
 G. favulosa var. confluens  = Glyphis cicatricosa
 G. favulosa var. depauperata  = Glyphis cicatricosa
 G. favulosa var. intermedia  = Glyphis cicatricosa
 G. gyrizans  = Sarcographa glyphiza, Graphidaceae
 G. heteroclita  = Sarcographa heteroclita, Graphidaceae
 G. kirtoniana  = Sarcographa kirtoniana, Graphidaceae
 G. labyrinthica sensu auct. brit. = Syncesia myrticola, Roccellaceae
 G. labyrinthica  = Sarcographa labyrinthica, Graphidaceae
 G. medusulina  = Sarcographa medusulina, Graphidaceae
 G. sericea  = Leiorreuma sericeum, Graphidaceae
 G. subtricosa  = Sarcographa subtricosa, Graphidaceae
 G. verruculosa  = Glyphis cicatricosa

References

Graphidaceae
Lichen genera
Taxa named by Erik Acharius
Ostropales genera